WRHC-LP (106.7 FM) is a radio station licensed to Three Oaks, Michigan, United States.  The station is currently owned by Harbor Arts.

References

External links
 

RHC-LP
RHC-LP
Radio stations established in 2005
2005 establishments in Michigan